Argyripnus electronus is a species of ray-finned fish in the genus Argyripnus found in the Southeast Pacific.

References

Taxa named by Nikolai Vasilyevich Parin
Fish described in 1992
Sternoptychidae